Jabal Al-Qalom (جبل القلوم ) is a mountain in Tabuk Region Saudi Arabia.

References

Qalom
Midian